Tanda is a town in eastern Ivory Coast. It is a sub-prefecture and the seat of Tanda Department in Gontougo Region, Zanzan District. Tanda is also a commune.
In 2021, the population of the sub-prefecture of Tanda was 69,597.

Villages
The thirty four villages of the sub-prefecture of Tanda and their population in 2014 are:

Notes

Sub-prefectures of Gontougo
Communes of Gontougo